is a former Japanese football player. He played for Japan national team.

Club career
Sonobe was born in Ibaraki Prefecture on March 29, 1958. After graduating from high school, he joined Fujita Industries in 1976. The club won the league champions in 1977, 1979 and 1981. The club also won 1977 and 1979 Emperor's Cup. He retired in 1989. He played 173 games and scored 2 goals in the league. He was selected Best Eleven in 1978, 1979.

National team career
On May 23, 1978, Sonobe debuted for Japan national team against Thailand. He played 7 games for Japan until 1981.

National team statistics

References

External links
 
 Japan National Football Team Database

1958 births
Living people
Association football people from Ibaraki Prefecture
Japanese footballers
Japan international footballers
Japan Soccer League players
Shonan Bellmare players
Association football defenders